In telecommunication, a disturbance voltage is an unwanted voltage induced in a system by natural or man-made sources.

In telecommunications systems, the disturbance voltage creates currents that limit or interfere with the interchange of information. An example of a disturbance voltage is a voltage that produces (a) false signals in a telephone, (b) Noise (radio) in a radio receiver, or (c) distortion in a received signal.

References

Electrical parameters
Telecommunications engineering
Noise (electronics)